Edwin Hartmann (October 3, 1910 – March 9, 1996) was a former Austrian soldier and skier.

Hartmann served at the Garnisonssportvereinigung Innsbruck (garrison's sports union). He and his comrades Haslwanter, Schuler, Kleißl, Niederkofler and Hartmann were state champion in 1933, and won the championships of Tyrol in 1935 and 1937. In 1934, Hartmann was champion of Kärnten and East Tyrol. He was also a member of the national Olympic military patrol team, which finished fourth at the 1936 Winter Olympics.

References 

1910 births
1996 deaths
Austrian military patrol (sport) runners
Olympic biathletes of Austria
Military patrol competitors at the 1936 Winter Olympics